Ursal Yasar (born 12 May 1980) is a retired Swiss football striker and later manager.

References

1980 births
Living people
Swiss people of Turkish descent
Swiss men's footballers
FC Zürich players
FC Winterthur players
FC Schaffhausen players
FC Concordia Basel players
FC Tuggen players
SC Young Fellows Juventus players
Association football forwards
Swiss Super League players
Switzerland youth international footballers